Lars Tvinde (11 September 1886 – 25 June 1973) was a Norwegian stage and film actor.

Biography
Tvinde was born at Voss in Hordaland, Norway. He was the son of Knut Haldorsen (1843–1927) and Eli Jørgensdotter Leidal (1842–1927). 
He attended Voss folkehøgskule and for eight years, he worked for his uncle at a store in Vossevangen. He also appeared at amateur theater in Bergen.

He started working for Det Norske Teatret in  Oslo during 1912. He said the first lines at the theatre's opening performance, Ivar Aasen's Ervingen, on 2 January 1913. He is regarded as one of the driving forces at Det Norske Teatret, from its first season until his retirement in 1958.
During his time on stage, he created memorable characters in both  comic and the tragic roles.

He also had a number of roles in film. He made his film debut in 1920 as Haldor in  Fante-Anne directed by Rasmus Breistein.  He played  in Himmeluret (1925), Bra mennesker (1937) and Godvakker-Maren (1940).
Tvinde was a board member of the Norwegian Acting Federation 1932-39.

He was awarded the Hulda Garborgs stipend in 1926 and the Norwegian Theatre Critics Award (Teaterkritikerprisen) in 1939 and awarded the State artist grant (Statens kunstnarløn) in 1955.
Tvinde was decorated Commander of the Royal Norwegian Order of St. Olav in 1964.

Personal life
In 1923 he married Gudrun Friedricksen (1894–1982).

Filmography

References

Other sources
Dalgard, Olav (1966) Lars Tvinde (Oslo : Noregs boklag)

External links

1886 births
1973 deaths
People from Voss
People from Hordaland
Norwegian male stage actors
Norwegian male silent film actors
20th-century Norwegian male actors
Recipients of the St. Olav's Medal